Mauno Pekkala (27 January 1890 – 30 June 1952) was a Finnish statesman and politician who served as Prime Minister from 1946 to 1948.

Pekkala was a member of the Social Democratic Party of Finland and member of several wartime cabinets as Minister of Finance from December 1939 to February 1942. Pekkala left the party after the Continuation War.

After the war, Pekkala joined the Finnish People's Democratic League (SKDL), an alliance of communists, socialists and social democrats. He served as the Minister of Defence between April 1945 and March 1946.

He was candidate in the 1950 presidential election. Pekkala also belonged to the Socialist Unity Party which worked inside the SKDL.

Mauno Pekkala was the brother of Eino Pekkala.

Cabinets
 Pekkala Cabinet

References

1890 births
1952 deaths
People from Sysmä
People from Mikkeli Province (Grand Duchy of Finland)
Social Democratic Party of Finland politicians
Socialist Unity Party (Finland) politicians
Finnish People's Democratic League politicians
Prime Ministers of Finland
Ministers of Agriculture of Finland
Ministers of Finance of Finland
Ministers of Defence of Finland
Members of the Parliament of Finland (1927–29)
Members of the Parliament of Finland (1929–30)
Members of the Parliament of Finland (1930–33)
Members of the Parliament of Finland (1933–36)
Members of the Parliament of Finland (1936–39)
Members of the Parliament of Finland (1939–45)
Members of the Parliament of Finland (1945–48)
Members of the Parliament of Finland (1948–51)
Members of the Parliament of Finland (1951–54)
Finnish foresters
University of Helsinki alumni
Finnish people of World War II